Haim Gozali (born May 6, 1973), also known by the nickname The Israeli Batman, is an Israeli mixed martial artist who competed in the welterweight division. He is best known for his tenure in Bellator. Gozali is also a 5th degree Brazilian Jiu Jitsu black belt under Renzo Gracie. He is also the first Israeli to compete in the Bare Knuckle Fighting Championship.

Background
Gozali served at the Israel Border Police in the Israeli army. Later, Gozali was stabbed six times while working as a bouncer in an Israeli night club.

Gozali's nickname, "The Israeli Batman", was given to him by Bellator's announcer Mike Goldberg, and is related to his obsession with the legendary superhero. He has "collected enough Batman comics and paraphernalia to fill up most of a room in his house in Bat Yam" and he "has enough Batman tattoos to cover a good part of his skin, with the bat-sign prominently carried across his chest."

Gozali has one son and a daughter. His son, Aviv, is also a mixed martial artist and is currently signed to Bellator.

Mixed martial arts career
In 2010, Gozali produced the MMA event Israel FC: Genesis in Israel, that featured multiple UFC veterans. Following the event's success, he later signed with Bellator MMA to work as a promoter and produced 4 events in Israel with the promotion - Bellator 164, Bellator 188 and Bellator 209, Bellator 234, which took place at Menora Mivtachim Arena in Tel Aviv.

Gozali is the president of ADCC Israel and the first Israeli to compete in an ADCC event. Gozali is also the head of Renzo Gracie Israel Academy in Bat Yam.

Gozali is the first Israeli MMA fighter to compete in Madison Square Garden.

On November 16, 2017, Gozali scored the second fastest submission in Bellator's Welterweight division, ending the fight 45 seconds into the first round.

Bellator MMA
Gozali faced Ryan Couture in a welterweight bout at Bellator 180 on June 24, 2017. He lost the fight via unanimous decision.

After racking three straight victories, Gozali was scheduled to appear on the same event, Bellator 234, with his son Aviv in their native Israel. Haim faced Artur Pronin and won the fight via first-round submission. Haim retired after the fight.

Mixed martial arts record

|-
| Win
| align=center| 15–6
| Ilya Lupinov 
| Submission (triangle choke)
| RFP 86
| 
| align=center| 1
| align=center| 1:35
| Kyiv, Ukraine
|Middleweight bout; won the vacant RFP Middleweight Championship.
|-
| Win
| align=center| 14–6
| Andrey Savchuck 
| Submission (heel hook)
| TDT 1
| 
| align=center| 1
| align=center| 0:05
| Dubno, Ukraine
|Light Heavyweight debut; won the TDT Light Heavyweight Championship.
|-
| Win
| align=center| 13–6
| Dmitriy Makhotskiy 
| Submission (triangle choke)
| RFP 80
| 
| align=center| 2
| align=center| 1:56
| Kyiv, Ukraine
|Return to Middleweight; won the RFP Middleweight Championship.
|-
| Win
| align=center| 12–6
| Artur Pronin 
| Submission (heel hook)
| Bellator 234
| 
| align=center| 1
| align=center| 4:12
| Tel Aviv, Israel
|
|-
| Win
| align=center| 11–6
| Gustavo Wurlitzer
| Submission (triangle choke)
| Bellator 222
| 
| align=center| 1
| align=center| 4:02
| New York, New York, United States
|Catchweight (175 lb) bout.
|-
| Win
| align=center| 10–6
| Dmitriy Makhotskiy
| Submission (heel hook)
| RFP: International MFC 1
| 
| align=center| 1
| align=center| 2:57
| Kyiv, Ukraine
|
|-
| Win
| align=center| 9–6
| Alexey Kolesnikov
| Submission (armbar)
| RFP: International MFC 1
| 
| align=center| 1
| align=center| 2:37
| Kyiv, Ukraine
|
|-
| Loss
| align=center| 8–6
| Ryan Couture
| Decision (unanimous)
| Bellator 209
| 
| align=center| 3
| align=center| 5:00
| Tel Aviv, Israel
|
|-
| Loss
| align=center| 8–5
| Jose Campos
| Decision (unanimous)
| Bellator 192
| 
| align=center| 3
| align=center| 5:00
| Inglewood, California, United States
|
|-
| Win
| align=center| 8–4
| Arsen Faitovich
| Technical Submission (triangle choke)
| Bellator 188
| 
| align=center| 1
| align=center| 0:45
| Tel Aviv, Israel
| 
|-
| Loss
| align=center| 7–4
| Ryan Couture
| Decision (unanimous)
| Bellator 180
| 
| align=center| 3
| align=center| 5:00
| New York City, New York, United States
| 
|-
| Win
| align=center| 7–3
| Zane Clerk
| Submission (heel hook)
| Bellator 164
| 
| align=center| 1
| align=center| 1:41
| Tel Aviv, Israel
| 
|-
| Win
| align=center| 6–3
| Zdravko Zdravkov
| Submission (armbar)
| AFN 1
| 
| align=center| 1
| align=center| 0:33
| Sliven, Bulgaria
| 
|-
| Loss
| align=center| 5–3
| Rustam Bogatyrev
| TKO (retirement)
| MFP: Mayor Cup 2012
| 
| align=center| 1
| align=center| 5:00
| Khabarovsk, Russia
| 
|-
| Loss
| align=center| 5–2
| Ronaldo Souza
| Submission (rear-naked choke)
| Jungle Fight 7
| 
| align=center| 1
| align=center| 1:33
| Ljubljana, Slovenia
| 
|-
| Win
| align=center| 5–1
| Alcs Plotkin
| Submission (triangle choke)
| WPKL 2
| 
| align=center| 1
| align=center| 2:22
| Israel
| 
|-
| Win
| align=center| 4–1
| Yakov Mazer
| KO (punch)
| WPKL 1
| 
| align=center| 1
| align=center| 1:35
| Israel
| 
|-
| Win
| align=center| 3–1
| Dan Koan
| Submission (punches)
| IVTC 2
| 
| align=center| 1
| align=center| 4:55
| Israel
| 
|-
| Win
| align=center| 2–1
| Guy Micali
| Submission (punches)
| IFFC 1
| 
| align=center| 1
| align=center| 3:34
| Israel
| 
|-
| Win
| align=center| 1–1
| Maer Cobi Coen
| Submission (triangle choke)
| IVTC 1
| 
| align=center| 1
| align=center| 2:34
| Israel
| 
|-
| Loss
| align=center| 0–1
| Carlos Newton
| Submission (armbar)
| IFC: Israel vs. Canada
| 
| align=center| 1
| align=center| 0:00
| Israel
|

Bareknuckle boxing record

|-
|Win
|align=center|2-0
|Bogdan Kotlovyanov
|TKO (punches)
|IWCC 1
|
|align=center|2
|align=center|N/A
|Tel Aviv, Israel
|
|-
|Win
|align=center|1–0
|John McAllister	
|TKO (punch)
|BKFC: KnuckleMania
|
|align=center|2
|align=center|1:08
|Lakeland, Florida, United States
|
|-

References

External links
 

1973 births
People from Bat Yam
Living people
Israeli male mixed martial artists
Welterweight mixed martial artists
Mixed martial artists utilizing ninjutsu
Mixed martial artists utilizing karate
Mixed martial artists utilizing boxing
Mixed martial artists utilizing Brazilian jiu-jitsu
Israeli practitioners of Brazilian jiu-jitsu
People awarded a black belt in Brazilian jiu-jitsu
Israeli male boxers
Bare-knuckle boxers
Israeli soldiers